The Institut Superieur de Communication d’Organisation et de Management (Iscom University, Benin) is a private university in Cotonou, the largest city and economic capital of the Benin. Iscom University is one of the first institution in Benin to operate a functional online learning platform.

History 
Iscom was established in February 2005 at first, as a tutorial college for some foreign universities. Iscom opened as a tertiary education institution in July 2007, and was accredited to offer certificates, diplomas, undergraduate degreees and postgraduate programmes by the Ministry of Higher Education and Scientific Research (MHESR) in Republic of Benin.

In 2014, UNESCO signed a memorandum of understanding with Iscom University to provide tuition for Iscom students who achieved a 4.0 GPA and above as part of its tertiary education fund for Francophone countries.

In March 2018, the university partnered with the Aminu Kano International Foundation to award 50 scholarships to Nigerian students from Kano State to study at the university.

Academics

Facts and Stats  

Iscom University, Benin is a privately owned university located in Senade-Akpakpa, Cotonou, Benin Republic and it is ranked as one of the country's top 10 universities.

It is one of the nation's first-largest city universities and has over 10 faculties, 45 departments and 13 research laboratories. It is fully accredited by the Ministry of Higher Education and Scientific Research, Benin Republic and UNESCO.

Nigerian Graduates of ISCOM University are duly qualified to go for the one year mandatory National Youth Service Corps program (NYSC).

References

Universities in Benin